Oleksiy Oleksandrovych Chubashev (16 November 1991 – 10 June 2022) was a Ukrainian military journalist, military serviceman, major (posthumously) of the Main Intelligence Directorate of the Ministry of Defence of Ukraine, a participant in the Russo-Ukrainian War.

Biography
Chubashev was born in Polohy, Zaporizhzhia Oblast. He enrolled in the Ivan Bohun Military High School in 2008, and participated with the school in the Kyiv Independence Day Parade in 2009. On his graduation in 2015, he was assigned to a tour of duty with Ukrainian forces deployed during the War in Donbas. That same year he joined the Central Television and Radio Studio of the Ministry of Defence, working to write and host Ukraine's first military reality show, Rekrut.UA.

His contractual term of service in the military expired on 28 February 2021, and he entered the reserve. He returned to active service during on 24 February 2022, following the Russian invasion.

Chubashev was killed in action on 10 June 2022, during the Battle of Sievierodonetsk. He was survived by his wife, a infant daughter and a son born in March 2022. His funeral was held in Kyiv on 14 June 2022.

Military ranks
Major (28 June 2022, posthumously)

References

Sources
 На фронті загинув військовий журналіст родом із Запорізької області // Суспільне. Новини. — 11 June 2022.
 На війні загинув автор проєкту на підтримку ЗСУ «Рекрут.UA» Олексій Чубашев // АрміяInform. — 11 June 2022.
 Кравченко, О. На війні загинув журналіст і офіцер Олексій «Рекрут» Чубашев // LB.ua. — 10 June 2022.

1991 births
2022 deaths
People from Polohy
Ukrainian military personnel killed in the 2022 Russian invasion of Ukraine